Egyptian Melodies is a 1931 Silly Symphonies animated short subject produced by Walt Disney and directed by Wilfred Jackson.

Summary
When a spider goes down into an Egyptian tomb, he instantly regrets going there when the mummies and hieroglyphs come to life.

Plot
The short film starts near the entrance of the Sphinx in Ancient Egypt, a spider plays his web like a harp. He notices the door shaking and jumps off his web, the door slowly opens up revealing pitch blackness. He creeps up to the open door, and tells us quietly to follow him. Beyond the open door is a long, dark hallway with a few staircases leading downward. The spider gets scared by a falling piece of brick and flees, he then tumbles down a staircase. He hears a ticking sound and goes to see what the source of the sound is. Now in a large Egyptian tomb, he giggles at the camera and points at a sandtimer but gets scared when the bell atop it starts ringing. He flees and tries hiding in a sarcophagus but flees away at the sight of a mummy. Four other sarcophaguses open up, revealing four more mummies. The spider screams "Mummies!" and hides inside a vase, the mummies begin dancing around the tomb. After the mummies are back in their sarcophaguses, the spider looks around and then spots the hieroglyphics on the tomb's wall, these come to life and start dancing. The hieroglyphics begin hosting a chariot race but then start a massive fight, the spider looks in horror at the crazed hieroglyphics and screams petrified. The poor spider cowers in fear and runs out of the tomb, up the staircases, down the stone halls and out of the door, running for his dear life over the desert dunes.

Reception
Variety (February 23, 1932): "One of Walt Disney's Silly Symphonies and just fair filler matter. Nice penmanship, as usual in this series, is outstanding. Starts out as though it's going to be original, with an Egyptian background, and one of the sphinxes suddenly opens a door. Spider crawls in and down corridors, with then the usual ghost and mummy stuff."

Home media
The short was released on December 4, 2001, on Walt Disney Treasures: Silly Symphonies - The Historic Musical Animated Classics.

References

External links
 

American animated short films
1931 short films
1931 animated films
1931 films
1930s Disney animated short films
Films directed by Wilfred Jackson
Films produced by Walt Disney
Films set in Egypt
Silly Symphonies
Mummy films
Films scored by Frank Churchill
American black-and-white films
Columbia Pictures animated short films
Columbia Pictures short films
1930s American films